Assistant physician in the United States (not to be confused with a physician assistant) is a Medical Doctor (MD) or Doctor of Osteopathic Medicine (DO) who has graduated from a four-year medical school program and is licensed to practice in a limited capacity under the supervision of a physician who has completed his or her residency. The Assistant Physician license is currently issued in Missouri, Virginia, New Hampshire, Utah, and Arkansas.

In 2019, the state of Missouri rejected a proposed legislation which would have allowed assistant physicians to collaborate with physician assistants and nurse practitioners and also provide a pathway to becoming a full physician without completing a residency program. The American Academy of Family Physicians (AAFP) objected stating that the move would expose patients to sub-standard care.

References 

Physicians
Health care occupations